Higashinotōin Street (東洞院通 ひがしのとういんどおり higashinotōin dōri) is a street running north to south in the city of Kyoto, Japan. It extends for approximately 3.5 km from Marutamachi Street (north) to Shiokōji Street (south).

History 
This street corresponds to the Higashinotōin Ōji Street of the Heian-kyō.

Between the years of 1716 and 1736, due to increased traffic, the street became Japan's first one-way street.

During the Meiji period, the Kiyamachi line of the Kyoto Electric Railway tram ran between Shiokōji and Nanajō Streets.

Currently, only the section between Nanajō Street and Shiokōji Street has two lanes; the rest is a narrow one-way street.

Adjoining landmarks 

 Kyoto Imperial Palace
 Nakagyō-ku Post Office
 Rokkaku-dō Temple
 Daimaru Kyoto Store

References 
Streets in Kyoto